During the 1935–36 English football season, Brentford competed in the Football League First Division for the first time in the club's history. A torrid run in the opening half of the season left Brentford in the relegation places, but after a number of key signings were made, just two defeats from Christmas Day 1935 through to the end of the season elevated the Bees to an impressive 5th-place finish, the club's highest-ever in the league pyramid. Brentford also reached the final of the London Challenge Cup for the second consecutive season, but were beaten by league rivals Arsenal. In 2013, the Brentford supporters voted 1935–36 as the club's third-best season.

Season summary
In preparation for the 1935–36 season, Brentford manager Harry Curtis elected to stick with the nucleus of players that had elevated the club from the Third Division South to the First Division in just three seasons, his only significant signing being right back Joe Wilson from Southend United. The Bees had a dream start to their first season in the top-flight, going to the top of the division after a 2–0 opening day victory over Bolton Wanderers. A 2–1 home defeat to Huddersfield Town two matches later gave way to a run of 11 defeats in 17 matches, which left the club in the relegation places.

Previously-prolific scorers Jack Holliday and Idris Hopkins had had a difficult time adjusting to the higher level, with scoring just 13 goals between them by the time the Bees were mired in the relegation battle at the end of 1935. Manager Curtis recognised the need to strengthen the squad in mid-season, dropping and later selling full back Jack Astley, left half Jackie Burns and forwards Charlie Fletcher and George Robson. In addition, former captain Herbert Watson was dropped from the half back line. In came Welsh international left half Dai Richards for £3,500 and Scottish forwards David McCulloch and Bobby Reid, with McCulloch signing for a club record £6,000 fee.

The signings had an inspired effect, sending the Bees on a run of just two defeats in the remaining 23 matches of the season, with forward McCulloch netting an impressive 26 goals in 27 appearances to finish as top-scorer. Manager Harry Curtis also signed a new five-year contract in February 1936. Brentford finished their debut season in the First Division in 5th place, which as of the end of the 2015–16 season is the club's highest-ever in the pyramid. Brentford also reached the final of the London Challenge Cup for the second-successive season, but were defeated 4–2 by league rivals Arsenal. The Bees' club record attendance for a home Football League match was broken twice during the season, with 33,481 attending versus Huddersfield Town on 7 September 1935 and 33,486 for the West London derby with Chelsea on 28 March 1936.

League table

Results
Brentford's goal tally listed first.

Legend

Football League First Division

FA Cup

 Sources: Statto, 11v11, 100 Years of Brentford

Playing squad 
Players' ages are as of the opening day of the 1935–36 season.

 Sources: 100 Years of Brentford, Timeless Bees, Football League Players' Records 1888 to 1939

Coaching staff

Statistics

Appearances and goals

Players listed in italics left the club mid-season.
Source: 100 Years of Brentford

Goalscorers 

Players listed in italics left the club mid-season.
Source: 100 Years of Brentford

International caps

Management

Summary

Transfers & loans 
Cricketers are not included in this list.

References 

Brentford F.C. seasons
Brentford